Burwell Otis Jones (March 23, 1933 – February 6, 2021) was an American former competition swimmer and Pan American Games champion.

Career
At the 1951 Pan American Games held in Buenos Aires, Argentina, he won the bronze medal in the men's 100-meter backstroke, and a gold medal in the men's 4×200-meter freestyle relay event, alongside teammates Dick Cleveland, Ronald Gora and Bill Heusner.

At the 1952 Summer Olympics in Helsinki, Finland, Jones swam for the gold medal-winning U.S. team in the preliminary heats of the men's 4×200-meter freestyle relay. Although the U.S. team finished first, Jones did not receive a medal under the 1952 rules because he did not swim in the event final.

Jones attended the University of Michigan, where he swam for the Michigan Wolverines swimming and diving team in National Collegiate Athletic Association (NCAA) competition from 1952 to 1954.

See also
 List of University of Michigan alumni

References

External links
 
 

1933 births
2021 deaths
American male backstroke swimmers
American male freestyle swimmers
Michigan Wolverines men's swimmers
Olympic swimmers of the United States
Swimmers from Detroit
Swimmers at the 1951 Pan American Games
Swimmers at the 1952 Summer Olympics
Pan American Games gold medalists for the United States
Pan American Games bronze medalists for the United States
Pan American Games medalists in swimming
Medalists at the 1951 Pan American Games
20th-century American people
21st-century American people